Black Belt Jones is a 1974 American blaxploitation martial arts film directed by Robert Clouse and starring Jim Kelly and Gloria Hendry. The film is a spiritual successor to Clouse's prior film Enter the Dragon, in which Kelly had a supporting role. Here, Kelly features in his first starring role as the eponymous character; is a local hero who fights the Mafia and a local drug dealer threatening his friend's dojo.

Plot
The Mafia have learned of the construction of a new civic center, and have bought up all the land at the intended building site except for a karate dojo owned by "Pop" Byrd (Scatman Crothers), who refuses to give up his property. The Don contacts an indebted drug dealer named "Pinky", who had laundered $250,000 from the Mafia that he'd subsequently loaned to Pop Byrd in-order to get the dojo built. The Don orders Pinky to either get his money back or repossess the property. "Black Belt" Jones (Jim Kelly), an expert martial artist and hand-for-hire, is contacted by his old friend Pop to help protect the dojo. Though Pinky intends to offer Pop to trade the building in exchange for clearing their mutual debt to the Don, he accidentally kills him during an intimidation attempt. Before he dies, Pop tells Pinky that he couldn't give them the building even if he wanted to, as it belongs not to him but his daughter Sydney. Pinky sends thugs to the dojo to try and intimidate the other employees. Though he was unable to protect his friend, Jones and the other students effortlessly fend off the thugs.

Sydney (Gloria Hendry) returns home upon hearing of her father's sudden death. She's told about his debt to the Mafia, but refuses to sell the building, instead seeking vengeance on those responsible for her father's death.. Sydney approaches Pinky's men and ends up in a brawl, managing to overcome them due to her own martial arts training. As retaliation, Pinky kidnaps one of the students, Quincy (Eric Laneuville) and demands for them to turn over the school or give him the money. Jones and Sydney, with support from the police department, rob the Mafia and proceed to give it to Pinky, framing him for the heist. They rescue Quincy, and Pinky proceeds to send his henchmen after Jones, who has to take them on all at once. Jones and his allies manage to subdue them, and they are subsequently arrested.

Cast
 Jim Kelly as "Black Belt" Jones
 Gloria Hendry as Sydney Byrd
 Scatman Crothers as "Pop" Byrd
 Eric Laneuville as Quincy
 Alan Weeks as "Toppy"
 Andre Philippe as Don Steffano
 Vincent Barbi as "Big Tuna"
 Mel Novak as "Blue Eyes"
 Malik Carter as "Pinky"
 Eddie Smith as Oscar
 Earl Jolly Brown as "Jelly"
 Jac Emil as Marvin "Marv The Butcher"
 Earl Maynard as Bogart
 Marla Gibbs as Betty 
 Ted Lange as Militant
 Clarence Barnes as "Tango"
 Esther Sutherland as Lucy
 Nate Esformes as Roberts

Production
The Shaw Brothers, a major Hong Kong movie studio, initiated the U.S. Kung Fu film invasion with 1972's Five Fingers of Death and other films depicting realistic and brutal action.

In 1973, Cleopatra Jones connected martial arts in Blaxploitation, with a strong Black female lead, skillfully trained in karate.

As a teenager born in Millersburg, Kentucky and raised in Paris, Kentucky Jim Kelly grew up as an all-around athlete, and had a chance to become a professional football player. He gained his fame in the martial arts community through the 1971 Ed Parkers Internationals. After completing Enter the Dragon, he immediately signed a three-film deal with Warner Bros. Black Belt Jones was filmed soon after. Kelly is still arguably most known for his role in Enter the Dragon.

Reception
The film had a mixed reception. Some reviewers critiqued Kelly for trying to be too much like Bruce Lee, and thought the acting was only fair. Yet it still gained a cult film status later on.

Soundtrack
Funk guitarist Dennis Coffey is credited for the film's soundtrack.

Sequel
The film was followed by a sequel, Hot Potato.

See also
 List of American films of 1974

References

External links

 
 

1974 films
1974 martial arts films
American martial arts films
Blaxploitation films
Karate films
Kung fu films
Jones, Black Belt
Warner Bros. films
American action films
1970s action films
American films about revenge
American vigilante films
American action adventure films
American exploitation films
1970s English-language films
1970s American films